Hollywood Star Lanes was a 32-lane bowling alley located on Santa Monica Boulevard in Los Angeles, California. Open from 1960 to 2002, the alley was featured in the film The Big Lebowski, which was filmed on location over three weeks of the eleven-week filming schedule. It was also a filming location for The Big Empty. In 2002, the alley was closed after the Los Angeles Unified School District seized the land by eminent domain in order to build an elementary school at the site (today known as Kingsley Elementary School).

In July 1977, the area behind the bowling alley was used by the FBI as a staging area to conduct a raid on two nearby Scientology locations.

References

Defunct entertainment venues
Bowling alleys
Buildings and structures in Los Angeles
The Big Lebowski